The Palacio arzobispal of Santiago is the administrative seat of the Arquidiócesis de Santiago de Chile. It stands, along with the Parroquia El Sagrario and the Catedral Metropolitana, on the west side of  the Plaza de Armas,  in the historical downtown of the city.

History 
Its construction started in 1852, when the architect Claudio Brunet de Baines was commissioned by the government. Brunet de Baines died in 1855 and the construction was stopped until 1869, when the construction was resumed, this time led by the French architect Lucien Hénault. The works were finished in 1870 and an elevator was installed in the 1930s.

The Palacio arzobispal was declared as a national monument by the Ministerio de Educación in 1975.

References 

1870 in Chile
Buildings and structures in Santiago
[[Category:Baroque Revival architecture in Chile]